The Boca Raton Symphony Orchestra was a Boca Raton, Florida based chamber orchestra founded in 1983 by Paul McRae, the principal trumpet with the Fort Lauderdale Symphony Orchestra.  There was a great deal of overlap between the Boca Raton and Fort Lauderdale groups from the beginning, and in 1985, the two orchestras were legally merged to form the Philharmonic Orchestra of Florida which would serve the South Florida community until its financial collapse in 2003.

References

Disbanded American orchestras
Musical groups established in 1983
Boca Raton, Florida
Orchestras based in Florida
1983 establishments in Florida
1985 disestablishments in Florida
Musical groups disestablished in 1985